William Devlin (born 23 January 1891) was an English professional footballer.

After beginning his professional career with Stockport County, Devlin joined Cardiff City in 1912, reuniting with his former Stockport manager Fred Stewart. He helped the club win the Southern Football League Second Division title in his first season and remained with the Bluebirds until 1919,. returning to the club after the Football League resumed matches following the end of World War I. In November 1919, he joined Newport County and later spent one season with Exeter City.

Honours
Cardiff City
 Southern Football League Second Division winner: 1912–13

References

1891 births
English footballers
Wallsend F.C. players
Stockport County F.C. players
Cardiff City F.C. players
Newport County A.F.C. players
Exeter City F.C. players
English Football League players
Southern Football League players
Association football forwards
Year of death missing